The Roman Catholic Diocese of Tepic) is a suffragan Latin diocese in the ecclesiastical province of the Metropolitan Archdiocese of Guadalajara in western Mexico.

Its cathedral episcopal see is the Catedral de la Purísima Concepción, dedicated to the Immaculate Conception, in Tepic, the capital of Nayarit state. It also has a Minor Basilica: Basílica de Nuestra Señora del Rosario de Talpa, dedicated to Our Lady of the Rosary, in Talpa de Allende, Jalisco.

Statistics 
As per 2014, it pastorally served 1,168,480 Catholics (88.1% of 1,325,985 total) on 22,777 km² in 92 parishes and 36 missions with 214 priests (207 diocesan, 7 religious), 205 lay religious (11 brothers, 194 sisters) and 54 seminarians.

History 
It was erected 23 June 1891 as Diocese of Tepic / Tepicen(sis) (Latin), on territory split off from its Metropolitan, the Archdiocese of Guadalajara.

Bishops
(all Roman Rite)

Episcopal ordinaries
Suffragan Bishops of Tepic 
 Ignacio Díaz y Macedo (1893.01.19 – death 1905.06.14) 
 Andrés Segura y Domínguez (1906.08.06 – death 1918.08.13) 
 Manuel Azpeitia Palomar (1919.08.10 – death 1935.03.01) 
 Anastasio Hurtado y Robles (1935.12.21 – retired 1970.07.13), emeritate as Titular Bishop of Cissa (1970.07.13 – resigned 1970.12.31); died 1972 
 Auxiliary Bishop: José Manuel Piña Torres (1958.05.12 – retired 1970.05.16), Titular Bishop of Milevum (1958.05.12 – death 1997.07.07)
 Adolfo Antonio Suárez Rivera (1971.05.14 – 1980.05.08), next Bishop of Tlalnepantla (Mexico) (1980.05.08 – 1983.11.08), Metropolitan Archbishop of Monterrey (Mexico) (1983.11.08 – 2003.01.25), President of Conferencia del Episcopado Mexicano (C.E.M.) (1988 – 1994), Apostolic Administrator of Ciudad Victoria (Mexico) (1994.11.03 – retired 1995.12), created Cardinal-Priest of Nostra Signora di Guadalupe a Monte Mario (1994.11.26 – death 2008.03.22)
 Alfonso Humberto Robles Cota (1981.01.12 – retired 2008.02.21), died 2017
 Ricardo Watty Urquidi (2008.02.21 – death 2011.11.01), Spiritans (M.Sp.S.), previously Titular Bishop of Macomades (1980.05.27 – 1989.11.06) as Auxiliary Bishop of México (City) (Mexico) (1980.05.27 – 1989.11.06), Bishop of Nuevo Laredo (Mexico) (1989.11.06 – 2008.02.21)
 Luis Artemio Flores Calzada (30 March 2012 – ...), previously Bishop of Valle de Chalco (Mexico) (2003.07.08 – 2012.03.30).

Auxiliary bishop
José Manuel Piña Torres (1958-1970)

Other priests of this diocese who became bishops
Mario Espinosa Contreras, appointed Bishop of Tehuacán, Puebla in 1996
Jesús Antonio Lerma Nolasco, appointed Auxiliary Bishop of México, Federal District in 2009

See also 
 List of Catholic dioceses in Mexico
 Immaculate Conception Cathedral, Tepic

References

Sources and external links 
 GCatholic, with Google map and satellite photo - data for all sections
 Tehuantepec - Catholic Encyclopedia article
 

Roman Catholic dioceses in Mexico
Roman Catholic Ecclesiastical Province of Guadalajara
Religious organizations established in 1891
Roman Catholic dioceses and prelatures established in the 19th century
1891 establishments in Mexico